Serge Tsmikeboki (born February 16, 1967) is a former professional footballer who played as a striker.

External links

1967 births
Living people
Guadeloupean footballers
Association football forwards
Chamois Niortais F.C. players
Ligue 2 players